Raymonde de Kervern (1898 or 1899 – 1973) was a Mauritian poet.

Life
Raymonde de Kervern was born in Curepipe, the daughter of a doctor, Joseph Alphonse, and Marie-Jeanne-Wilhelmine Piat. In 1918 she married Louis-Gustave-Philippe de Kervern.

Her poems were collected in a single Collected Works in 2014.

Works
 Cloches mystiques, 1928.
 Le Jardin féerique, 1935.
 L'île Ronde et son oiseau, 1935
 Apsara la danseuse, 1941.
 Abîmes, 1951.

References

1899 births
1973 deaths
Mauritian poets
Mauritian women writers
20th-century Mauritian writers
20th-century women writers